Godfrey Smith may refer to:
 Godfrey Smith (politician)
 Godfrey Smith (priest)
 Godfrey Smith (journalist)